Mahajeran (also Romanized as Mahājerān; also known as Mohājerān) is a city in Pol-e Doab Rural District, Zalian District, Shazand County, Markazi Province, Iran. At the 2006 census, its population was 11,109, in 2,894 families.

References 

Populated places in Shazand County
Cities in Markazi Province